Île Sèche is an islet in Seychelles.

It lies 1.5 km of the eastern point of Ste. Anne Island, and 7.5 km from Mahe. and reaches an elevation of 30 meters. Small, rocky, boulder-strewn and uninhabited, it is the nesting ground of sea-gulls.
The island is a granite rock on top of which some low growing trees.

The tiny island is also known as Beacon island.

About 2.15 km to its south lies some granite rocks called Harrison Rocks, 0.30 acres in size.

Image gallery

References

External links 

 Info on the island

Islands of Mont Fleuri